Corridor of Mirrors is a 1948 British drama film directed by Terence Young and starring Eric Portman, Edana Romney and Barbara Mullen. It was based on a novel by Chris Massie and featured the film debut of both Terence Young and Christopher Lee.

Cast
 Eric Portman as Paul Mangin
 Edana Romney as Mifanwy Conway
 Barbara Mullen as Veronica
 Hugh Sinclair as Owen Rhys
 Bruce Belfrage as Sir David Conway
 Alan Wheatley as Edgar Orsen
 Joan Maude as Caroline Hart
 Leslie Weston as Mortimer
 Christopher Lee as Charles
 Hugh Latimer as Bing
 John Penrose as Brandy
 Lois Maxwell as Lois
 Mavis Villiers as Babs
 Thora Hird as Lady in Madame Tussauds

Critical reception
In his 4/5 star review in the Radio Times, David Parkinson wrote: "the more eccentric the action gets (and the more manic Georges Auric's score seems), the more compelling it becomes. In her sole starring venture, Romney (who also co-scripted) isn't quite up to the task. But Portman is magnificently unhinged and Terence Verity's art direction is outstanding."

References

Bibliography
 Geoff Mayer & Brian McDonnell. Encyclopedia of Film Noir. ABC-CLIO, 2007.

External links

Review of film at Variety

1948 films
Film noir
1948 drama films
1940s English-language films
Films directed by Terence Young
British drama films
Films based on novels
British black-and-white films
1948 directorial debut films
1940s British films